Kushavati was a city in Kosala Kingdom as per epic Ramayana. The king of Kosala Lord Rama installed his son Lava at Sravasti on the northern part of the kingdom and Kusha at Kushavati in the south. It was located on the slopes of the Vindhya Range.

Names
Kushavati is the name of:
A town named Kushavati in Karnataka state near Sharavati river.
A river in Goa, West India.

References

Ancient Indian cities
Places in the Ramayana